The Ghost of Sierra de Cobre is a 1964 American made-for-television horror–thriller film starring Martin Landau, Judith Anderson and Diane Baker. It was written, produced and directed by Joseph Stefano, author of the screenplay for Alfred Hitchcock's 1960 thriller Psycho., and he cast actors who had been in Hitchcock's films, since Landau was in North by Northwest (1959), Anderson was in Rebecca (1940 film), and Baker was in Marnie (film) (1964).

The film was a pilot for a proposed supernatural anthology series for CBS called The Haunted. The series was not picked up after CBS president James T. Aubrey left but some additional footage was filmed and it was released as a standalone film.

Plot
Nelson Orion (Martin Landau) is an architect by profession and paranormal investigator by choice. He is engaged by heiress Vivia Mandore (Diane Baker) who mistakenly thought herself free from the domination of her recently deceased mother-in-law. However, the old woman is determined to continue her controlling ways... from beyond the grave.

Cast
Martin Landau as Nelson Orion
Judith Anderson as Paulina
Diane Baker as Vivia Mandore
Tom Simcox as Henry Mandore
Nellie Burt as Mary Finch
Leonard Stone as Benedict Sloane
Priscilla Morrill as The School Teacher

References

External links

1964 television films
1964 films
1960s horror thriller films
American horror thriller films
Films with screenplays by Joseph Stefano
Films scored by Dominic Frontiere
CBS network films
American thriller television films
Television films as pilots
Television pilots not picked up as a series
1960s American films